AMC was an Asian TV channel (excluding Malaysia and Vietnam) launched by AMC Networks International. AMC replaced the MGM Channel on January 1, 2015. AMC produced dramas Halt & Catch Fire, The Divide, Fear the Walking Dead, Into the Badlands, The Night Manager were among the first original series that premiered on the channel. The channel also airs movies from MGM, Paramount Pictures and Sony Pictures Entertainment.

The channel ceased broadcasting on December 31, 2018, at 24:00 hours., Meanwhile, AMC Asia was still available in Taiwan.

Final Programming
4th and Loud
Babylon
Eli Roth's History of Horror
Fear the Walking Dead
Game of Arms
Halt and Catch Fire
Hap and Leonard
Hell on Wheels
Hollywood's Best Film Directors
Humans 
Into the Badlands
Jack Irish
The Code
The Divide
The Night Manager
 The Terror

References

External links
AMC Asia Official Website

Television channels and stations established in 2015
Television channels and stations disestablished in 2018
AMC Networks International
Mass media in Southeast Asia
English-language television stations